Cristian Garín was the defending champion, but chose not to defend his title.

Juan Manuel Cerúndolo won the title, defeating Albert Ramos Viñolas in the final 6–0, 2–6, 6–2. Cerúndolo, who started the week ranked 335th and went through qualifying, became the first player to win a tournament on his ATP Tour debut since Santiago Ventura in 2004.

Seeds
The top four seeds received a bye into the second round.

Draw

Finals

Top half

Bottom half

Qualifying

Seeds

Qualifiers

Lucky loser

Qualifying draw

First qualifier

Second qualifier

Third qualifier

Fourth qualifier

External links
 Main draw
 Qualifying draw

2021 Singles
2021 ATP Tour
2021 in Argentine tennis